The 1974 LPGA Championship was the 20th LPGA Championship, held June 20–23 at Pleasant Valley Country Club in Sutton, Massachusetts, southeast of Worcester.

Sandra Haynie, the 1965 champion, won her second LPGA Championship, two strokes ahead of JoAnne Carner. It was the second of her four major titles.

Past champions in the field

Source:

Final leaderboard
Sunday, June 23, 1974

Source:

References

External links
Golf Observer leaderboard

LPGA Championship
LPGA Championship
LPGA Championship
Golf in Massachusetts
History of Worcester County, Massachusetts
LPGA Championship
Sports competitions in Massachusetts
Sports in Worcester County, Massachusetts
Sutton, Massachusetts
Tourist attractions in Worcester County, Massachusetts
Women's PGA Championship
Women's sports in Massachusetts